The International Sanitary Convention for Aerial Navigation (1944) was an international sanitary convention, one of the international co-operation land-marks in the history of public health, signed in Washington on 15 December 1944, and came into force on 15 January 1945.

References 

1944 in aviation
Aviation agreements
Aviation law
International travel documents
Medical records
Vaccination